Sung Kyung-Hwa (Korean: 성경화; born July 20, 1965), also spelled as Seong Gyeong-hwa, is a South Korean team handball player and Olympic champion.
She received a silver medal with the South Korean team at the 1984 Summer Olympics in Los Angeles. Her team won the gold medals at the 1988 Summer Olympics in Seoul.

References

External links

1965 births
Living people
South Korean female handball players
Olympic handball players of South Korea
Handball players at the 1984 Summer Olympics
Handball players at the 1988 Summer Olympics
Olympic gold medalists for South Korea
Olympic medalists in handball
Medalists at the 1988 Summer Olympics
Medalists at the 1984 Summer Olympics
Olympic silver medalists for South Korea
20th-century South Korean women